Elizabeth Scripps "Nackey" Loeb (February 24, 1924 – January 8, 2000) was publisher of the Manchester Union Leader newspaper (later The New Hampshire Union Leader) in Manchester, New Hampshire, from 1981 to 1999.

Personal life 
Elizabeth Scripps was born on February 24, 1924, to Robert Paine Scripps and Margaret Lou Culbertson. Her paternal grandfather, newspaper titan E.W. Scripps, founded the E. W. Scripps Company. Her father died in 1938, shortly after her 14th birthday.

She attended Scripps College, which had been founded by her great-aunt, Ellen Browning Scripps. In 1944, she married George Gallowhur, who invented Skol suntan lotion and had relationships with men; they had one daughter and later divorced. She then married William Loeb III; they had one daughter, Edith Tomasko, who died in 2014.

She used a wheelchair after a 1977 car accident left her paralyzed from the chest down and President Ronald Reagan in 1984 appointed her to the Architectural and Transportation Barriers Compliance Board.

Union Leader 
She helped her husband run the Union Leader for decades until his death in 1981. She then succeeded him as publisher and served until that role until stepping down in 1999, shortly before her death.

Legacy 
She died on January 8, 2000. She founded the Nackey S. Loeb School of Communications, which has majority ownership of the Union Leader newspaper and gives out an annual Nackey S. Loeb First Amendment Award.

Further reading 

 Meg Heckman. Political Godmother: Nackey Scripps Loeb and the Newspaper That Shook the Republican Party (2020). .

References 

1924 births
2000 deaths
American newspaper publishers (people)

